The 2004 FIBA Asia Championship for Women is the qualifying tournament for FIBA Asia at the women's basketball tournament at the 2004 Summer Olympics at Athens. The tournament was held on Sendai, Japan from January 13 to January 19. The championship is divided into two levels: Level I and Level II.

Preliminary round

Level I

Level II

Final round

Semifinals

3rd place

Final

Final standing

Awards

Most Valuable Player:  Miao Lijie

References
 Results
 archive.fiba.com
 jabba-net.com

2004
2004 in women's basketball
women
International women's basketball competitions hosted by Japan
B